Fancy Free is an album by bassist Richard Davis recorded in 1977 and released on the Galaxy label.

Reception
Allmusic awarded the album 3 stars stating "an advanced and mostly straightahead effort".

Track listing 
 "The Wine of May" (Loonis McGlohon) – 5:21   
 "Silver's Serenade" (Horace Silver) – 9:46   
 "Emily" (Johnny Mandel, Johnny Mercer) – 4:52   
 "Nardis" (Miles Davis) – 4:22   
 "I Still Love You, Baby" (P. Davis, Dolly Hirota) – 5:42   
 "Fancy Free" (Donald Byrd) – 7:52

Personnel 
Richard Davis – bass
Eddie Henderson – trumpet, flugelhorn (tracks 1, 2 & 4–6) 
Joe Henderson – tenor saxophone 
Stanley Cowell – piano, electric piano 
Billy Cobham – drums 
Dolly Hirota – vocals (track 5)
Bill Lee – arranger, conductor

References 

Richard Davis (bassist) albums
1977 albums
Galaxy Records albums